Seta (standing for  "Sexual equality"), founded in 1974, is the main LGBT rights organisation in Finland. It is a national organization with several member organizations around the country. Its general secretary is Kerttu Tarjamo and chairman Sakris Kupila. The 11th President of Finland, Tarja Halonen, was the chairwoman of Seta 1980–81.

Awards
Seta awards the annual Asiallisen tiedon omena (the "Apple of Objective Information") to people or organizations that have improved the status of LGBT minorities or distributed objective information about the diversity of sexuality and gender. It has been awarded to the following people or organizations, among others:

 2008 to singer Jenni Vartiainen and songwriter Teemu Brunila for their single "Ihmisten edessä". According to Seta, the piece is an apposite evocation of the courage needed from LGBT people to e.g. publicly hold hands.

The Kunniarotta ("Rat of Honor") is an ironic anti-honor awarded to people or organizations that have contributed to discrimination based on sexuality or gender identity, or otherwise made the life of LGBT people more difficult. The Rat has been awarded e.g. to the following:

 2003 to Finnish Red Cross for not accepting donated blood from men that have had sex with another man. According to Seta, this stamps a whole group of people as potential carriers of the HIV virus, which in Seta's opinion keeps up the discriminatory attitudes.
 2006 to professor Tuula Tamminen, chairwoman of the Mannerheim League for Child Welfare, for stating that fatherless children are abnormal and that for this reason infertility treatments should not be given to female couples or single women. According to Seta, Tamminen has abused her recognized position and against the ethics of science ignored the numerous studies stating that it is the stability of family relationships, not the number or genders of the parents, that are crucial for the child's welfare and development.
 2008 to lord mayor Raimo Ilaskivi, MP Bjarne Kallis, and general Gustav Hägglund for their statements in the fuss caused by the puppet animation The Butterfly from Ural.

See also

LGBT rights in Finland
List of LGBT rights organizations

References

External links

 

LGBT organisations in Finland
Organisations based in Helsinki
Tarja Halonen
1974 establishments in Finland
Organizations established in 1974